Walk Tall is an album by American saxophonist Eric Marienthal released in 1998, and recorded for the Verve label. It is Marienthal's tribute to the music of Cannonball Adderley. The album reached No. 13 on the Billboard Contemporary Jazz chart.

Track listing
 Mercy, Mercy, Mercy (Joe Zawinul) – 5:24
 Work Song (Nat Adderley/Oscar Brown) – 4:24
 Walk Tall (Zawinul/Jim Rein/Queen Esther Marrow) – 4:40
 Skylark (Hoagy Carmichael/Johnny Mercer) – 3:31
 Imagine That (Eric Marienthal/Rob Mullins) – 4:34
 The Way You Look Tonight (Jerome Kern/Dorothy Fields) – 5:30
 Here in My Heart (Mullins) – 4:37
 Sunstone (Russell Ferrante) – 4:23
 If You Need Me To (Harvey Mason) – 3:31
 Country Preacher (Zawinul) – 5:29
 Unit 7 (Sam Jones) – 5:01
 Groove Runner (Jeff Lorber/Marienthal) – 4:13

Personnel
 Eric Marienthal – saxophone
 Chris Botti – trumpet
 Chuck Findley – trumpet
 John Beasley – keyboards
 Russell Ferrante – keyboards
 Ronnie Foster – keyboards
 Rob Mullins – keyboards
 Stanley Clarke – bass
 Melvin Davis – bass guitar
 Chuck Domanico – bass guitar, double bass
 Reggie Hamilton – bass guitar
 Allen Hinds – guitar
 Lee Ritenour – guitar
 Michael Thompson – guitar
 Michael Mishaw - Background Vocals (8)
 Kevyn Lettau - Background Vocals (8)

Charts

References

External links
Walk Tall at Discogs
Walk Tall at Verve Music Group

1998 albums
Verve Records albums
Tribute albums